Valley Springs School District is a public school district in Boone County, Arkansas, United States which serves the cities of Bellefonte, Everton and Valley Springs along with surrounding unincorporated areas within Boone County.

Schools
 Valley Springs High School
 Valley Springs Middle School
 Valley Springs Elementary School

Valley Springs High School

Valley Springs High School serves ninth through twelfth grades. Based on the 2009-2010 academic year, the total enrollment in the school was 283 and total full-time teachers was 30.30, with a teacher/student ratio of 9.34.

Valley Springs Middle School
Valley Springs Middle School serves fifth through eighth grades. Based on the 2009-2010 academic year, the total enrollment in the school was 287 and total full-time teachers was 33, with a teacher/student ratio of 8.70. Current teachers: Erica Ketchum, Kendall Melton Sara King Karena DeYoung Daniel Lance for downstairs.

Valley Springs Elementary School
Valley Springs Elementary School serves preschool through fourth grades. Based on the 2009-2010 academic year, the total enrollment in the school was 413 and total full-time teachers was 26.70, with a teacher/student ratio of 15.47.

Staffing
Based on the 2009-2010 academic year, the total full-time staff of the Valley Springs School District was 175. The total full-time teachers was 90. The total number of non-teaching staff (including 5 administrators) was 85.

Demographics
Within the geographic area covered by the Valley Springs School District, there were 1,046 individuals under the age of 18, during the 2009-2010 academic year.

See also

 List of school districts in Arkansas

References

External links

 Boone County School District Reference Map (US Census Bureau, 2010)
 2011 Arkansas Legislative Audit for the Valley Springs School District

School districts in Arkansas
Education in Boone County, Arkansas
Schools in Boone County, Arkansas